Sauromates IV (flourished 3rd century – died 276) was a Roman client king of the Bosporan Kingdom. Like the other late Bosporan kings, Sauromates IV is known only from coinage, which means his relationship to the other kings is unknown, as are details of his accession and reign. His coins are known only from 276, when he apparently co-ruled with Rhescuporis V and Teiranes. It is possible that he was a son of Rhescuporis V.

See also
 Bosporan Kingdom
 Roman Crimea

References

Monarchs of the Bosporan Kingdom
Roman client rulers
276 deaths
3rd-century monarchs in Europe
Year of birth unknown
Julii